Jai Valley (/ʒæɪ ˈvæli/) is an enchanting valley located  northeast of Bhaderwah town in Jammu and Kashmir, India. The Bhaderwah-Jai road, which passes through the corniferous deodar forests of Nakshri, Balote, Bhalara and Chinta Valley connects the valley with the Bhaderwah town. The valley has green meadows which act as the attraction for tourists in summers and the snow-covered landscape during winters. It is also known by the names Jai Garh and Jai Top. There is no Mobile Network in this valley.

About

Jai, located in Bhaderwah tehsil (subdistrict) of Doda district in the Jammu division, it is a high altitude tourist destination, 32 kilometers northeast of Bhaderwah by Bhaderwah-Chinta-Jai Road. Every year thousands of tourist visits there, including the locals also. It is also connected with Bhalessa-Jai-Bhaderwah road. In summers, local Gurjars visit Jai along with their cattles where they have own mudhouses. The valley is surrounded with corniferous trees and towards its east lies the Bhalessa Valley which is connected through 46 kilometers Jai-Bhalessa Road, encompasses the hunting grounds of Bachdhar. Another 27 Kilometers Kahara-Jai Road also linked Kahara tehsil (subdistrict) to this valley. 

Wild herbs like Guchchi (Morels), Kasrod (Fiddlehead fern) Foxglove, Aconitum, Mayapple and more can be found here.

Tourism

Jai gets thousands of tourist visits every year mostly in summers. The Bhaderwah-Jai road climbs uphill in the last 30 kilometres to Jai passing through forests of pine and fir of Nakshri, Balote, Bhalara and Chinta Valley. It is one of the scenic tourist spot in Bhaderwah. There are various natural waterfalls and the activities such as rock-climbing and hard-core trekking can be performed here. The Jai Nallah is famous
for Trout Fish Culture. The source of water in Jai Nallah stream are the different natural springs which are found at various places of Jai, while Chenab Valley have hundreds of these natural springs found commonly in every village and forest areas. Due to these natural springs, this stream remain running all the year.

Winter sports like skiing, ice skating and sledging can be played when the snow covers entire valley in winters. There are igloo huts for tourists to stay in the valley. 
Chinta and Jai valleys have the favourable climate and environment for basics and training in paragliding. Paragliding is the special attraction of hilly areas but it is feasible all over the year except wet seasons.

Road connectivity
There are three roads which connects Jai Valley to other parts, which are as follows;

Main road
Bhaderwah-Jai Road, a  road from Bhaderwah town to Jai Valley, having blacktop except some areas, is the main road which is commonly used to visit Jai. This road is located on the southwestern direction from Jai towards Bhaderwah town.

Alternate link roads
Gandoh-Jai Road, a  road from Gandoh (Bhalessa) to Jai, constructed but it lacks blacktop at maximum locations. This road is located in eastern side of Jai.
Kahara-Jai Road, a  road from Kahara tehsil (subdistrict) to Jai, which is under construction in 2020. This road is located on northern side of Jai.

See also

On Wikipedia
Tourist destinations in Doda district

External links
Jai Valley - Bhaderwah in August 2015

Notes

References

Doda district
Valleys of Jammu and Kashmir
River valleys of India
Tourist attractions in Doda district